The Austro-Polish War or Polish-Austrian War was a part of the War of the Fifth Coalition in 1809 (a coalition of the Austrian Empire and the United Kingdom against Napoleon's French Empire and Bavaria). In this war, Polish forces of the Napoleon-allied Duchy of Warsaw and assisted by forces of the Kingdom of Saxony, fought against the Austrian Empire. In June, the Russian Empire joined against Austria. Polish troops withstood the Austrian attack on Warsaw defeating them at Raszyn, then abandoned Warsaw in order to reconquer parts of pre-partition Poland including Kraków and Lwów, forcing the Austrians to abandon Warsaw in futile pursuit.

The war
The military of the Duchy was weakened as the French corps garrisoning it were sent to Spain in 1808, and only the Duchy's own Polish forces remained in it. With the start of the War of the Fifth Coalition, Austrian corps under Archduke Ferdinand Karl Joseph of Austria-Este invaded the territory of the Duchy of Warsaw (Polish state created by Napoleon) on 14 April 1809, engaging the Polish defenders soldiers under Prince Józef Poniatowski).

After the Battle of Raszyn on 19 April, where Poniatowski's Polish troops brought an Austrian force twice their number to a standstill (but neither side defeated the other decisively), the Polish forces nonetheless retreated, allowing the Austrians to occupy the Duchy's capital, Warsaw, as Poniatowski decided that the city would be hard to defend, and instead decided to keep his army mobile in the field and engage the Austrians elsewhere, crossing to the eastern (right) bank of the Vistula. Indeed, the Duchy's capital was seized by the Austrian army with little opposition, but it was a Pyrrhic victory for them, since the Austrian commander diverted most of his forces there at the expense of other fronts. Ferdinand garrisoned Warsaw with 10,000 soldiers, and split his remaining forces, sending 6,000 corps to the right bank of the Vistula, and the rest towards Toruń and other targets on the left bank.

In a series of battles (at Radzymin, Grochów and Ostrówek), the Polish forces defeated elements of the Austrian army, forcing the Austrians to retreat to the western side of the river. First a major attack on bridges in Warsaw's suburb of Praga by a 6,000-strong Austrian force which had crossed the river earlier was stopped by 1,000 Polish fortified defenders. Soon afterwards the Austrian forces besieging Praga were defeated by General Michał Sokolnicki, first at the battle of Grochów (on 26 April), later, when the Austrian army tried to pursue Sokolnicki's Poles, it was routed on 2 and 3 May at the battle of Góra Kalwaria (in which battle the Poles also destroyed the Austrians' partially built bridge together with their engineering equipment). This left the initiative on the right bank firmly with the Poles.

In the following weeks Greater Poland was defended by the Corps of General Henryk Dąbrowski, while Poniatowski left only a small screening force guarding bridges on the Vistula and moved the rest of his forces southwards. Ferdinand made a few more attempts, trying to establish a bridgehead on the other side of the Vistula, but these were defeated. Polish forces successfully prevented the Austrians from crossing the river, and, staying close to the Vistula to control the situation, invaded the weakly defended Austrian territory to the south, on Austrian forces rear, taking parts of the recently partitioned Polish territories. Polish forces took the major cities of Lublin (14 May), Sandomierz (18 May), Zamość (20 May), and Lwów (27 May). A Polish administration and military formations were quickly organized on the taken territories, while generals Jan Henryk Dąbrowski and Józef Zajączek commanded the units slowing down the Austrians on the western bank of the Vistula.

Eventually the Austrian main army under Archduke Ferdinand, unable to push further on the left bank, and in danger of having its supply lines cut by Poniatowski, was forced to abandon the siege of Toruń, abandon Warsaw itself (on 1 June) and move south, planning to engage the Polish army to the south in Galicia and at some point merge with the main Austrian army operating further to the west. Poniatowski decided not to engage the Austrian forces, concentrating instead on taking as much of Galicia as possible.

On 3 June, Russian forces also crossed the Austrian border to Galicia, trying to prevent the Poles from gaining too much strength and hoping to take some Austrian-held territories with no intent of returning them after the war. The Russian forces were, in theory, honouring a stipulation in the Treaty of Tilsit which called for Russia to join France in the event of an Austrian breach of the peace, but Russian and Austrian forces still considered each other de facto allies. The commander in the theatre, Sergei Golitsyn, had instructions to aid the Polish as little as possible.

The Austrians managed to defeat Zajączek at the Battle of Jedlińsk on 11 June and took back Sandomierz (on 18 June) and Lwów, but were unable to engage Poniatowski, who in the meantime had taken Kielce and Kraków (15 July). Zajączek's corps would join up with Poniatowski's on 19 June, and with Dąbrowski's and Sokolnicki's on 3 and 4 July. The Austrians were finally intercepted and defeated by the French at the Battle of Wagram (5 July – 6 July).

Austrian Order of Battle
On 5 July 1809, the Austrian forces operating in Poland numbered 18,700 infantry, 2,400 cavalry, and 66 artillery pieces. The total of 23,200 troops were organized into 26 infantry battalions and 28 squadrons in 4 cavalry regiments. The order of battle is listed below.

VII Armeekorps: Feldmarschall-Leutnant Archduke Ferdinand Karl Joseph of Austria-Este 
 Artillery Reserve: Commander unknown
 Two 12-pdr position batteries (12 guns)
 6-pdr position battery (6 guns)
 3-pdr cavalry battery (6 guns)
 Division: Feldmarschall-Leutnant Johann Friedrich von Mohr
 Divisional Artillery: 3-pdr cavalry battery (6 guns)
 Brigade: General-Major Kelgrer 
 1st Wallachian Grenz Infantry Regiment # 16 (2 battalions)
 Vukassovich Infantry Regiment # 48 (3 battalions)
 Brigade: Commander unknown
 2nd Wallachian Grenz Infantry Regiment # 17 (2 battalions)
 Szekler Grenz Hussar Regiment # 11 (8 squadrons)
 Brigade: Commander unknown
 1st Szekler Grenz Infantry Regiment # 14 (2 battalions)
 2nd Szekler Grenz Infantry Regiment # 15 (2 battalions)
 3-pdr brigade battery (8 guns)
 Division: Feldmarschall-Leutnant Ludwig von Mondet
 Divisional Artillery: 6-pdr position battery (6 guns)
 Brigade: General-Major Karl Leopold Civalart d'Happoncourt
 Davidovich Infantry Regiment # 34 (3 battalions)
 Weidenfeld Infantry Regiment # 37 (3 battalions)
 6-pdr brigade battery (8 guns)
 Brigade: General-Major Franz von Pflacher
 De Ligne Infantry Regiment # 30 (3 battalions)
 Strauch Infantry Regiment # 24 (3 battalions)
 Kottulinsky Infantry Regiment # 41 (3 battalions)
 6-pdr brigade battery (8 guns)
 Division: Feldmarschall-Leutnant Karl August von Schauroth
 Divisional Artillery: 6-pdr cavalry battery (6 guns)
 Brigade: Commander unknown
 Palatinal Hussar Regiment # 12 (8 squadrons)
 Brigade: Commander unknown
 Somariva Cuirassier Regiment # 5 (6 squadrons)
 Lothringen Cuirassier Regiment # 7 (6 squadrons)

Aftermath
General Józef Poniatowski became a national hero in Poland following this campaign. He also received a ceremonial saber from Napoleon for his victories.

In the aftermath of the Treaty of Schönbrunn, most of the territory liberated by Polish forces (territory which had been annexed by the Austrian Empire during the partitions of Poland several decades beforehand) was incorporated into the Duchy of Warsaw.

Notes

References
 
 Wojna austriacko-polska, WIEM Encyklopedia
 Bronisław Pawłowski, Historia wojny polsko-austriackiej 1809 roku, original edition Warszawa 1935, reprinted Bellona, 1999,  
 Kamil Rosiak, W sto dziewięćdziesiąt lat po zgonie księcia Pepi... – część 2, Avatarea, 12/2003
 Bowden, Scotty & Tarbox, Charlie. Armies on the Danube 1809. Arlington, Texas: Empire Games Press, 1980.
 napoleon-series.org Austrian Generals 1792–1815 by Digby Smith, compiled by Leopold Kudrna (retrieved 6 Sept 2010). This is an excellent source for the full names of Austrian generals.
 Cairn.Info Non-Belligerent Belligerent Russia and the Franco-Austrian War of 1809 by Alexander Mikaberidze (retrieved 16 May 2013).

External links
 

Conflicts in 1809
Napoleonic Wars
Wars involving the Habsburg monarchy
Wars involving Poland
1809 in the Austrian Empire
Duchy of Warsaw